Alphatorquevirus is a genus of viruses in the family Anelloviridae, in group II in the Baltimore classification. It encompasses many species of the virus formerly known as TTV, transfusion transmitted virus, or torque teno virus, SENV, SANBAN, and others. The genus contains 26 species.

Taxonomy
The genus contains the following species:

Torque teno chlorocebus virus 1
Torque teno chlorocebus virus 2
Torque teno chlorocebus virus 3
Torque teno chlorocebus virus 5
Torque teno virus 1
Torque teno virus 2
Torque teno virus 3
Torque teno virus 4
Torque teno virus 5
Torque teno virus 6
Torque teno virus 7
Torque teno virus 9
Torque teno virus 10
Torque teno virus 13
Torque teno virus 14
Torque teno virus 15
Torque teno virus 17
Torque teno virus 18
Torque teno virus 19
Torque teno virus 20
Torque teno virus 21
Torque teno virus 24
Torque teno virus 25
Torque teno virus 26
Torque teno virus 29
Torque teno virus 31

History 
TTV, for transfusion transmitted virus or torque teno virus was first reported in a Japanese patient in 1997 by the research scientist T. Nishizawa.  The virus is extremely common, even in healthy individuals—as much as 100% prevalent in some countries, and in approximately 10% of blood donors in the UK and the US.  Although it does not appear to cause symptoms of hepatitis on its own, it is often found in patients with liver disease.  For the most part, TTV infection is believed to be asymptomatic.

Initially found in Japanese patients with hepatitis of unknown cause, TTV was detected in various populations without proven pathology, including blood donors.  This new virus was initially discovered in 1997 by means of representational difference analysis (RDA) in the plasma of a Japanese patient (initials T.T.) with posttransfusion hepatitis.  A sequence (N22) of 500 nucleotides (nt) was first characterized and further extended to about 3700 nt (TA278 clone). At that time, sequence analysis suggested that TTV was related to the Parvoviridae family. At the end of 1998, two independent studies demonstrated the presence of an additional GC-rich region of about 120 nt which led to the discovery of the circular nature of the TTV genome (~3800 nt). This finding established the relationship of TTV with the Circoviridae family.

Etymology
Initially the virus was named TTV after a patient with T.T. initials. Later the name torque (necklace) teno (from Latin tenuis - "thin") virus was adopted as it preserved the original abbreviation.

Viral spread 
The large number of epidemiological studies permitted to clearly point out the global distribution of the virus (Africa, North and South America, Asia, Europe, Oceania) in rural and urban populations. Despite that the link between TTV infection and a given pathology has not been shown, the hypothesis of a relation between viral load and the immune status of the host was suggested. Moreover, although initially suspected to be transmitted only by blood transfusion, the global dispersion of the virus in populations and its detection in various biologic samples (plasma, saliva, feces, etc...) suggest combined modes of diffusion, and in particular the spread by saliva droplets. Sexual transmission has also been proposed.

Related viruses have been found in chimpanzees, apes, African monkeys, tupaias, chickens, pigs, cows, sheep and dogs.

Vertical transmission has been reported in pigs.

Genome 
TTV's genome is a negative sense, circular single-stranded piece of DNA, approximately 3.8 kb in length; it is a non-enveloped virus with a virion of about 40 nm in diameter.  While bearing some similarity to members of the group Circoviridae, it lacks sequence homology with any known viruses. It is classified under the family Anelloviridae.

Its genome contains 2 large open reading frames, encoding 770 and 202 amino acids, as well as several smaller ORFs. The genomic region -154/-76 contains a critical promoter.

Isolates have been classified into five main clades numbered 1 to 5. TTV genogroup 3 also includes the 8 virus strains known as SENV-A to H.

Clinical
These viruses are not currently believed to cause disease in humans. Infection with these viruses tends to lead to lifelong viraemia and their possible association with disease remains under investigation. Higher than usual viral loads have been associated with severe idiopathic inflammatory myopathies, cancer and lupus.

Examination of faecal samples in 135 Brazilians with gastroenteritis showed evidence of the virus in 121 (91%). The presence of multiple genotypes was common.

The presence of this virus in acute lung injury and exacerbations of idiopathic lung fibrosis has been reported.

Increased viral loads in cases of congenital mannose-binding lectin deficiencies have been reported.

A possible case of aplastic anaemia with hepatitis has been reported.

One case of post-transplant hepatitis has been reported.

An association with head/neck cancer has been proposed.

TTV viral loads have been shown to increase in patients with immunosuppression. Increased levels of TTV have been observed, for example, in sepsis.

Since TTV is ubiquitous, and viral replication correlates with immune status, TTV has been studied as a promising marker to assess global functional immune competence in transplant recipients.

Replication 
Not much is known about TTV's replication, however based on animal circoviral studies, a double strand replication structure appears necessary. Some studies have described the presence of double strand TTV DNA in various tissues and organs suggesting an active replication in these localizations. These findings also minimize the hypothetic implication of TTV in hepatic disorders. No other data are at the present time available for TLMV (TTV-like Mini Virus – the strain infecting humans).

References

External links 
ICTV Virus Taxonomy 2009 
UniProt Taxonomy 
 
 ICTVdb
 ViralZone: Alphatorquevirus

Anelloviridae
Virus genera